The Women's 3000 metres race of the 2016 World Single Distances Speed Skating Championships was held on 11 February 2016.

Results
The race was started at 19:00.

References

Women's 3000 metres
World